A tangie (or tongie) is a shape-shifting sea spirit in the folklore of the Orkney and Shetland Islands in the British Isles. A sea horse or merman, it takes on the appearance of either a horse or an aged man. Usually described as being covered with seaweed, its name derives from "tang" or seaweed of the genus Fucus.

It is known for terrorizing lonely travellers, especially young women on roads at night near the lochs, whom it will abduct and devour under the water.

Similar yet distinctive from the smaller, less harmful Nuggle, a tangie is able to cause derangement in humans and animals.

The tangie plays a major role in the Shetland legend of Black Eric, a sheep rustler. The tangie he rode gave him supernatural assistance when he raided and harassed surrounding crofts. In his final battle with crofter Sandy Breamer, Black Eric fell to his death in the sea. The tangie then continued to terrorize the area, particularly the young women he was hoping to abduct.

Explanatory notes

References
Citations

Bibliography

　

Scottish folklore
Water spirits
Horses in mythology
Scottish legendary creatures
Shetland culture
Mermen